Salapuddin is a surname. Notable people with the surname include: 

Abdulgani Salapuddin (born 1952), Filipino politician
Fatmawati Salapuddin, Filipino politician